The Wych Elm cultivar Ulmus glabra 'Flava' was listed in the Dieck (Zöschen, Germany) catalogue of 1887 as U. scabra (: glabra) f. flava, but without description.  The tree should not be confused with Ulmus flava Michx. a probable misspelling of Ulmus fulva, a synonym of U. rubra, the Slippery or Red Elm from North America.

Description
Not available.

Cultivation
No specimens are known to survive.

References

Wych elm cultivar
Ulmus articles missing images
Ulmus
Missing elm cultivars